Andrew Gibson may refer to:

Sportspeople
Andrew Gibson (curler) (born 1979), Canadian curler
Andrew Gibson (footballer) (1890–1962), Scottish footballer (Southampton FC)
Andrew Gibson (Scottish footballer) in 2012–13 Hamilton Academical F.C. season
Andy Gibson (footballer, born 1969), Scottish footballer (Aberdeen FC)
Andy Gibson (footballer, born 1982), Scottish footballer (Partick Thistle)
Andy Gibson (golfer) in Maryland Open

Musicians
Andy Gibson (1913–1961), American jazz trumpeter, arranger, and composer
Andy Gibson (singer) (born 1981), American country music singer

Others
Andrew E. Gibson (1922–2001), American shipping executive
Andrew Harold Gibson (1883–1971), Canadian commissioner
Andrew William Gibson (born 1949), British writer and academic
Andrea Gibson (born 1975), American poet
Andy Gibson (steamboat), 1884 steamboat